Milan Bogićević, was a Serbian politician and diplomat. He served as Minister of Justice, Minister of Foreign Affairs and ambassador to Ottoman Empire, Austria-Hungary and German Empire.

References

Government ministers of Serbia
19th-century Serbian people
Politicians from Šabac
1840 births
1929 deaths
Foreign ministers of Serbia
Justice ministers of Serbia